The J.G. and Elizabeth S. Vawter House is a historic residence located in Winterset, Iowa, United States.  J.G. Vawter settled in Winterset in 1854 and was a local merchant.  His wife Elizabeth owned this house.  They left the community sometime before 1865.  This 2½-story structure is composed of locally quarried limestone.  Its construction is attributed to Caleb Clark, and it is the first mansion built in Madison County.  It features a main entry with a protruding arched, hood mold and a fan-shaped transom, large windows on the south elevation, lintels with cornices, two stone chimneys, a louvred attic window, and icicle-shaped bargeboards.  The house was listed on the National Register of Historic Places in 1987.

References

Houses completed in 1856
Vernacular architecture in Iowa
Houses in Winterset, Iowa
National Register of Historic Places in Madison County, Iowa
Houses on the National Register of Historic Places in Iowa